Irwin Delmore Davidson (January 2, 1906 – August 1, 1981) was an American lawyer, jurist, and politician who served one term as a Democratic-Liberal member of the United States House of Representatives from New York from 1955 to 1956. He was also a justice on the New York Supreme Court from 1963 to 1974.

Life
Davidson was born on January 2, 1906, in New York City. He graduated from New York University in 1927, and from New York University School of Law in 1928.

Political career 
He was a member of the New York State Assembly in 1937.

He was again a member of the State Assembly from 1939 to 1948, sitting in the 162nd, 163rd, 164th, 165th and 166th New York State Legislatures.

Congress 
He was elected to the 84th United States Congress, holding office from January 3, 1955, to December 31, 1956, when he resigned.

Judicial career 
He was a justice of the New York Supreme Court from 1963 to 1974.

Death 
He died at his home at Premium Point in New Rochelle, New York on August 1, 1981.

See also
List of Jewish members of the United States Congress

References

Sources

1906 births
1981 deaths
Politicians from New Rochelle, New York
New York University School of Law alumni
Democratic Party members of the New York State Assembly
New York Supreme Court Justices
Democratic Party members of the United States House of Representatives from New York (state)
Liberal Party of New York members of the United States House of Representatives
20th-century American politicians
20th-century American judges
Lawyers from New Rochelle, New York
20th-century American lawyers